Millie Grace Akoth Odhiambo Mabona (born 1 November 1966) is a Kenyan politician. She originally trained as a lawyer, and has been a member of parliament since 2008. She was first nominated and later elected as a Member of Mbita Constituency, (now Suba North Constituency).

Early life
Odhiambo was born in 1966 in Homa Bay to Harrison Odhiambo and Damaris Auma Odhiambo. She is the fourth of eight children. Her father Harrison Odhiambo died in 1973 in a boating accident, a moment that Odhiambo says helped spur her interest in politics.

Millie attended Homa Bay Primary School, St. Francis Girls Secondary School and Limuru Girls High School before she attended the University of Nairobi in 1986. She graduated in 1990 with a Bachelor of Laws degree. She would later study in the United States, Sweden and Italy.

She began her career in the attorney general's office practicing civil litigation before moving on to human rights law, with an emphasis on women and children. In 1999 she served as chairperson of Coalition on Violence Against Women-Kenya and from 2000 to 2008 was the founder and director of the CRADLE Children's Foundation, an organization working to improve children's rights in the legal system.

Political career
Odhiambo was nominated as a Member of Parliament in 2007 by Orange Democratic Movement then elected as a member of the Orange Democratic Movement in the 2013 Kenyan general election. Since taking her seat in Parliament, Kenyan media have described her as "controversial" and "outspoken".

Personal life
Millie married Magugu Mabona of Zimbabwe in 2006. The two first met online and currently have a long-distance relationship.

Odhiambo is a stepmother to Mabona's daughter Lebo, who lives in Botswana. She has been vocal about her struggle growing up with uterine fibroids, which led to both painful menstrual cycles and difficulty conceiving children.

References 

1966 births
Living people
University of Nairobi alumni
People from Homa Bay County
20th-century Kenyan lawyers
Members of the National Assembly (Kenya)
Kenyan women lawyers
21st-century Kenyan women politicians
21st-century Kenyan politicians
21st-century Kenyan lawyers
Orange Democratic Movement politicians
20th-century women lawyers
21st-century women lawyers